Pavlína Rajzlová (born 23 May 1972) is a Czech former professional tennis player.

Biography
Rajzlová played on the professional tour in the 1990s, reaching best rankings of 175 in singles and 127 in doubles.

Her best WTA Tour performance came at the 1993 Austrian Open, where she partnered Maja Murić to a runner-up finish in the doubles and had a singles win over world No. 31, Sandra Cecchini.

Now known as Pavlína Raisl, she works as a doctor in Germany, specialising in orthopedics.

WTA career finals

Doubles: 1 (runner-up)

ITF finals

Singles: 2 (2–0)

Doubles: 15 (8–7)

References

External links
 
 

1972 births
Living people
Czechoslovak female tennis players
Czech female tennis players
Czech emigrants to Germany